Lian Goodwin (born 29 April 1968) is a former synchronized swimmer from Great Britain.

References 

1968 births
Living people
British synchronised swimmers
Olympic synchronised swimmers of Great Britain
Synchronized swimmers at the 1988 Summer Olympics